Calvin Leroy Dill (born 4 September 1955) is a Bermudian sprinter. He competed in the men's 200 metres at the 1976 Summer Olympics.

References

1955 births
Living people
Athletes (track and field) at the 1976 Summer Olympics
Bermudian male sprinters
Olympic athletes of Bermuda
Athletes (track and field) at the 1974 British Commonwealth Games
Athletes (track and field) at the 1978 Commonwealth Games
Commonwealth Games competitors for Bermuda
Seton Hall Pirates men's track and field athletes
Place of birth missing (living people)